Täby Centrum is a shopping mall located in Täby, Stockholm, Sweden. It had 160 stores in 2014, which is expected to increase to 260 in 2015. It had approximately 10.1 million visitors in 2011, making it the fourth-biggest mall in Stockholm in terms of visitors, and second-biggest shopping centre in terms of sales, after Sickla Köpkvarter. The mall has received several awards, including "Best Swedish Shopping Centre" in 2014 and "Best Nordic Shopping Centre" in 2015 by the Nordic Council of Shopping Centers.

History
Täby Centrum was inaugurated in 1968, as the first shopping centre with a glass-vaulted ceiling in the Stockholm area. In 1991, the centre expanded with a  shopping street three stories tall, covered by an arching glass roof. In 2002, a large-scale plan for renovating and expanding the centre was initiated by the owner, Unibail-Rodamco, in cooperation with the municipality. Carried out in multiple stages and expected to be completed in 2015, this plan would lead to an almost completely new interior, an additional  of retail space, and approximately 4,000 indoor parking spaces.

Notable tenants
 First permanent Tesla Motors store established in a shopping mall in northern Europe, April 2014
 First Sephora (2012) and Ladurée (2013) to open in Sweden
 First official Apple Store to open in the Nordic region, in September 2012

See also 
 List of shopping centres in Sweden

References

External links

 
 June 22, 2014 video tour, YouTube 
 1976 clip of Täby Centrum, YouTube

Westfield Group
Shopping centres in Sweden
Shopping malls established in 1968
1968 establishments in Sweden
Buildings and structures in Stockholm County